Ryan R. Seymour (born February 7, 1990) is a former American football offensive guard who played in the National Football League (NFL). He was drafted by the Seattle Seahawks in the seventh round of the 2013 NFL Draft. He has also played for the San Francisco 49ers, Cleveland Browns, Chicago Bears, New Orleans Saints, New York Giants and Dallas Cowboys. He played college football for Vanderbilt.

Early life
He attended Camden County High School (GA) where he earned three letters in football as a two-way starter (DE & OG), and earned three letters as a varsity golfer. 
He was selected to the Georgia All-State AAAAA First Team (DE) by sportswriters and also named to "Jacksonville Times-Union"'s Georgia "Super South 11" team.

College career
Seymour started all 13 games as a senior in 2012 and concluded his Vanderbilt career with 35 starting assignments including starts at LG, LT, RG, and RT. Seymour opened the 2012 season with nine straight starts at left guard, then moved to start at both tackle positions when injuries affected depth along the line. He was selected to the 2009 SEC All-Freshman team. He was named to the  SEC Academic Honor Roll 2011 and 2012.

Seymour graduated from Vanderbilt University with a Bachelor of Science degree in December 2012.

Professional career

2013 NFL Draft
Seymour was drafted 220th overall by the Seattle Seahawks in the 2013 NFL Draft.

Seattle Seahawks
He was selected by the Seattle Seahawks in the seventh round (220nd pick overall) of the 2013 NFL Draft.

On August 31, 2013, Seymour was released by the Seahawks, and was re-signed to the Seahawks practice squad on September 11, 2013.

San Francisco 49ers
On December 10, 2013, the San Francisco 49ers signed Seymour from the Seattle Seahawks' practice squad.

Cleveland Browns
Seymour was claimed off waivers by the Cleveland Browns on August 31. He was waived on September 9, 2014, and re-signed to the 53 man roster on October 17, 2014.

On August 17, 2015, Seymour was suspended without pay for the first four games of the regular season for violating the NFL policy on performance-enhancing substances and was subsequently waived by the Cleveland Browns on August 27, 2015.

Chicago Bears
On October 7, 2015, the Chicago Bears signed Seymour to their practice squad. On October 13, 2015, Seymour was cut from the Bears practice squad.

New Orleans Saints
Seymour was signed to the New Orleans Saints practice squad on October 20, 2015. On December 26, 2015, the New Orleans Saints promoted Seymour to the 53-men roster and waived cornerback Tony Carter.

New York Giants 
Seymour signed with the New York Giants on April 4, 2016. On September 3, 2016, he was released by the Giants.

Dallas Cowboys
On October 11, 2016, Seymour was signed to the Cowboys' practice squad. On December 30, he was promoted to the active roster, because he was needed for depth purposes in the last game of the season, in order to rest some of the starters for the playoffs. He was released on January 4, 2017. He was re-signed on February 16, 2017.

On April 21, 2017, Seymour announced his retirement from the NFL.

References

External links
Vanderbilt Commodores bio

1990 births
Living people
People from Kingsland, Georgia
Players of American football from Georgia (U.S. state)
American football offensive guards
American football centers
Vanderbilt Commodores football players
Seattle Seahawks players
San Francisco 49ers players
Cleveland Browns players
Chicago Bears players
New Orleans Saints players
New York Giants players
Dallas Cowboys players